Coast banksia is a common name for several plants and may refer to:
 Banksia attenuata, commonly known as candlestick banksia, coast banksia or slender banksia;
 Banksia integrifolia, commonly known as coast banksia or white honeysuckle.

Banksia taxa by common name